Kermanshah Airport  is an airport in Kermanshah, Iran. It serves the city of Kermanshah and the surrounding areas with daily domestic and seasonal international destinations. It is located in the eastern part of the city and shares its land with the Havanirooz 1st Combat Base.

Airlines and destinations

References

Airports in Iran
Buildings and structures in Kermanshah
Transportation in Kermanshah Province